Bernard Hawkins (born May 18, 1963) is an American politician. He served as a Democratic member for the 53rd district of the Rhode Island House of Representatives.

Born in Greenville, Rhode Island, Hawkins attended Southern Connecticut State University. In 2019, he won the election for the 53rd district of the Rhode Island House of Representatives. Hawkins succeeded Thomas Winfield. He assumed his office on January 1, 2019. Hawkins decided to run for re-election for the 53rd district.

References 

1963 births
Living people
Democratic Party members of the Rhode Island House of Representatives
21st-century American politicians